Clinton Warrington Stanley (December 5, 1830 – December 1, 1884) was a justice of the New Hampshire Supreme Court from 1876 to 1884.

Born at Hopkinton, New Hampshire, Stanley graduated from Dartmouth College in 1849 and was admitted to the bar in 1862, forming a partnership with his old preceptor, George W. Morris of Manchester, in whose office he was a law student. The firm of Morris & Stanley had a large practice. In 1865, Stanley was chosen as president of the City National Bank and held that position for fourteen years. In 1881 he was elected a trustee of Dartmouth College, to succeed Judge Ira Allen Eastman. In 1874, on the reorganization of the judiciary system of the state, Stanley was made one of the judges of the new Circuit Court, and two years later, when the opposing political party abolished that court and restored the former system, he was retained on the Superior Court bench as a senior associate justice. He remained in that office until his death, in Manchester, New Hampshire.

References

1830 births
1884 deaths
People from Hopkinton, New Hampshire
Dartmouth College alumni
U.S. state supreme court judges admitted to the practice of law by reading law
Justices of the New Hampshire Supreme Court
19th-century American judges